This article lists political parties in Romania. Romania has a democratic multi-party system with numerous political parties, in which a political party does not often have the chance of gaining parliamentary majority alone, and, thus, parties must work with each other to form coalition governments. The current system was established following the Romanian Revolution of 1989 and the adoption of a new constitution in 1991; prior to these events, Romania was a single-party state under the rulership of the Romanian Communist Party (PCR).

Since the early 1990s, Romanian politics saw a gradual decrease in the number of political parties entering the Parliament and a relative consolidation of existing ones along ideological lines. Major political parties can be roughly grouped into three main "families", more specifically liberal, social democratic, or conservative. Extremist groups have a relatively low political profile in Romania, despite a surge in popularity of far-right and Eurosceptic political parties across many European Union (EU) countries during the 2010s.

Party switching remains a very concerning and significant issue, however, as does widespread corruption, leading to an overall low level of public trust in political parties (12% in December 2014). To counter this perception, the two largest parties as of 2015 (namely the Social Democrats and the National Liberals) have allegedly initiated a series of internal reforms to strengthen their integrity criteria and impose disciplinary sanctions on party members investigated or convicted on corruption charges.

Legal framework
Article 40 of the Constitution of Romania states that citizens can freely associate into political parties, with the exception of judges, military, and police personnel as well as other civil servants which are apolitical by law. The same article bans political parties which campaign against political pluralism, the rule of law, and Romania's sovereignty and territorial integrity. Romania's party system is regulated by Law no. 14/2003 on political parties; the law initially mandated a list of 25,000 supporters, residing in at least 18 counties and the Municipality of Bucharest, for a political party to be formally registered.

Nevertheless, in February 2015, the unregistered Pirate Party of Romania filed a complaint to the Constitutional Court, arguing that the list requirement is a violation of the constitutional provisions on freedom of association. The Court subsequently struck down the requirement as unconstitutional, and on 6 May 2015, the Romanian Parliament approved a modified version of the law, which allows the formation of a political party with 3 signatures.

Parties represented in the Parliament 

The current political parties with parliamentary representation, in order of the number of representatives they had obtained in the Chamber of Deputies and Senate following the 2020 legislative elections, are the following ones:

In addition, ethnic minority organizations are granted each seat in the Chamber of Deputies if: (1) are the sole official representative organization of the minority; (2) they participate in the legislative election and do not pass the 5% threshold but obtain at least 10% of the number of votes calculated to correspond to electing one deputy. These seats are added to the number of seats put up for election. As of 2021, there are eighteen such seats. The Hungarian minority organization, the Democratic Alliance of Hungarians in Romania (UDMR/RMDSZ) has always passed the 5% threshold for both houses of the Romanian Parliament, and has been treated as a regular political party (and acting like one as well).

Parties only represented in the European Parliament 

Besides the parties represented in the Romanian Parliament, the following parties only have representation in the European Parliament:

Minor parties

Ethnic minority organizations

Parties with elected representation at local and county level 

The following are political parties which ran by themselves at the 2020 local elections and won elected representation at local and county level (does not include seats won on alliance tickets):

{| class="wikitable sortable"
! Party
! Native name (Abbr.)
! data-sort-type="number" | Local councillors
! data-sort-type="number" | County councillors
!European Affiliation
|-
| Ecologist Party of Romania
| Partidul Ecologist Român (PER)
| 210
| 5
|
|-
| Green Party
| Partidul Verde  Verzii (PV)| 117
| 0
| European Green Party (EGP)
|-
| Christian Democratic National Peasants' Party
| Partidul Național Țărănesc Creștin Democrat (PNȚCD)| 42
| 0
| ECPM
|-
| New Right
| Noua Dreaptă (ND)| 2
| 0
| APF
|-
|}

The following parties have won seats in the 2020 local elections only as part of electoral alliances:

Defunct parties
Parties active 1859–1918

Parties active 1918−1947

The following parties were all active in Romania in the interwar period and, in some cases, through and after World War II.
Dates of founding and dissolution are given, where known. Failing that, the earliest and latest dates known for activities are given.

This period saw the proliferation of numerous extremist parties inspired by fascism, socialism and Communism. The latter were effectively banned in 1924 by the so-called Mârzescu law. A succession of coups drastically altered the political landscape as Romania went through a single-party dictatorship under the National Renaissance Front (1938–1940), then a military dictatorship without political parties (1940–1944), then briefly returning to multiparty democracy before finally becoming a people's republic (1944–1947).

 Communist-era parties (1947–1989) 

Although distinct parties in the communist era were not politically relevant, the following were the officially recognized political forces:

Other parties were allowed to exist, with unclear status, until mid 1948.

 Post−1989 parties 

 See also 

 Politics of Romania
 List of political parties by country

Notes

References
 110 ani de social-democrație în România ("110 Years of Social Democracy in Romania"), Social Democratic Party, Ovidiu Șincai Social Democratic Institute, Bucharest, July 9, 2003
Ion Constantinescu, "Dr. N. Lupu: «Dacă și d-ta ai fi fost bătut...»" ("Dr. N. Lupu: «If You Yourself Had Been Beaten...»"), in Magazin Istoric, August 1971
Victor Frunză, Istoria stalinismului în România ("History of Stalinism in Romania"), Humanitas, Bucharest, 1990
 Victoria Gabriela Gruber, Summary of Partidul Național Liberal (Gheorghe Brătianu) (PDF file)
 Gabriel Marin, "Între culpabilitate și mit: George Călinescu  - Un istoric literar român în timpul regimului comunist" ("In Between Guilt and Myth: George Călinescu - A Romanian Literary Historian during the Communist Regime"), in Erasmus, 1997
 Paula Mihailov, "Dubla criză a 'României profunde'" ("The Double Crisis of 'Profound Romania'"), in Jurnalul Național, July 12, 2005
Vasile Niculae, Ion Ilincioiu, Stelian Neagoe, Doctrina țărănistă în România. Antologie de texte ("Peasant Doctrine in Romania. Collected Texts"), Editura Noua Alternativă, Social Theory Institute of the Romanian Academy, Bucharest, 1994
Z. Ornea, Introduction and chronological table to George Panu, Amintiri de la "Junimea" din Iași ("Recollections from the Iași Junimea"), Ed. Minerva, Bucharest, 1998
 Petre Otu, "1946-1947. Se pregătește guvernul Argetoianu!" ("1946-1948. An Argetoianu Government Is Under Preparation!"), in Magazin Istoric, May 2000
Ioan Scurtu, Viața Politică din România 1918–1914 ("Political Life in Romania 1918–1914"), Editura Albatros, Bucharest, 1982
M. Ștefan, "În umbra Cortinei de Fier" ("In the Shadow of the Iron Curtain"), in Magazin Istoric, November 1995
Francisco Veiga, Istoria Gărzii de Fier, 1919-1941: Mistica ultranaționalismului ("History of the Iron Guard, 1919-1941: The Mystique of Ultra-Nationalism"), Humanitas, Bucharest, 1993
Nicolae Videnie, "«Alegerile» din martie 1948: epilogul listelor electorale alternative. Obsesia unanimității — primii pași" ("The «Elections» of March 1948: an Epilogue to Alternative Electoral Lists. Unanimity Obsession — The First Steps Taken"), in Dosarele Istoriei'', 11/V, 2000

External links 
 "Leftist parties in Romania" at broadleft.org
  Ioan Scurtu, Theodora Stănescu-Stanciu, Georgiana Margareta Scurtu, Istoria românilor între anii 1918-1940: IV. Partidele politice în primul deceniu interbelic ("Political programs of major parties in interwar Romania")

Romania
 
Political parties
Political parties
Romania